= Naratorn Pornjitkittichai =

Thai footballer (born 1999)

Personal information
- Full name: Naratorn Pornjitkittichai
- Date of birth: 24 October 1999 (age 27)
- Place of birth: Khon Kaen, Thailand
- Height: 1.80 m (5 ft 11 in)
- Position: Attacking midfielder

Team information
- Current team: Chainat Hornbill
- Number: 24

Youth career
- –2019: Buriram United

Senior career*
| Years | Team | Apps | (Gls) |
| 2019– | Chainat Hornbill | 2 | (0) |
- * Club domestic league appearances and goals

Naratorn Pornjitkittichai (Thai: นราธร พรจิตรกิตติชัย, born October 24, 1999), is a Thai professional footballer who plays as an attacking midfielder for Thai League 1 club Chainat Hornbill.
